The Natural Area Code (or Universal Address) is a proprietary geocode system for identifying an area anywhere on the Earth, or a volume of space anywhere around the Earth.  The use of thirty alphanumeric characters instead of only ten digits makes a NAC shorter than its numerical latitude/longitude equivalent.

Two-dimensional system 
Instead of numerical longitudes and latitudes, a grid with 30 rows and 30 columns - each cell denoted by the numbers 0-9 and the twenty consonants of the Latin alphabet - is laid over the flattened globe.  A NAC cell (or block) can be subdivided repeatedly into smaller NAC grids to yield an arbitrarily small area, subject to the ±1 m limitations of the World Geodetic System (WGS) data of 1984.

A NAC represents an area on the earth—the longer the NAC, the smaller the area (and thereby, location) represented.  A ten-character NAC can uniquely specify any building, house, or fixed object in the world.  An eight-character NAC specifies an area no larger than 25 metres by 50 metres, while a ten-character NAC cell is no larger than 0.8 metres by 1.6 metres.

Using a base 30 positional numeral system, NAC uses an alternate method which excludes vowels and avoids potential confusion between "0" (zero) and "O" (capital "o"), and "1" (one) and "I" (capital "i"):

For example, the ten-character NAC for the centre of the city of Brussels is HBV6R RG77T.

Extension to three dimensions 
The full NAC system provides a third coordinate: altitude.  This coordinate is the arctangent of the altitude, relative to the Earth's radius, and scaled so that the zero point (000...) is at the centre of the Earth, the midpoint (H00...) is the local radius of the geoid, i.e. the Earth's surface, and the endpoint (ZZZ...) is at infinity.

For example, the three-dimensional NAC for the centre of Brussels, at ground level, is HBV6R RG77T H0000.

See also
Military Grid Reference System
Universal Transverse Mercator coordinate system
Quadtree
Geohash

References

Further reading

External links
NAC Geographic Products
Use the Global Postal Code System Now

Geocodes